Steven L. Newman (born c. 1964) is an American businessman. He served as the president and chief executive of Transocean until February 16, 2015.

Biography

Early life
Steven Newman received a Bachelor of Science degree in petroleum engineering from Colorado School of Mines in 1989 and an M.B.A. from the Harvard Business School.

Career
He joined Transocean in 1994 in the  Corporate Planning Department. He became chief operating officer on October 16, 2006. He was executive vice president of performance for 2007–2008. He became president in May 2008 and chief executive officer on March 1, 2010, staying in that role until February 15, 2015.

References

1967 births
Transocean
Colorado School of Mines alumni
Harvard Business School alumni
Living people